Jean Rosenberg Feldman (born March 15, 1947, in Milan, Tennessee), better known as Dr. Jean, is an American teacher, author, and musical artist. She is well known for her children's learning songs. Dr. Jean has a PhD in Curriculum and Instruction, an M.A. in Early Childhood from Georgia State University, and a Diploma for Advanced Study in Teaching from Emory University. Dr. Jean has been educating for over 40 years and has created many resources for teachers in the classroom with their students. She releases her songs under the record label Music Design Record Company.

On April 30, 2010, Dr. Jean released a music video for her song, "Dr. Jean's Banana Dance". "Guacamole Song", the incorrect but more well-known name for "Dr. Jean's Banana Dance", rose rapidly in October and November 2015. The song gained 33 million views and quickly became an internet meme. It was featured on an episode of Kids React by the Fine Brothers. Since then, Dr. Jean has uploaded more music videos of her songs which has earned her over 87.4 million views and 169,000 subscribers on YouTube .

Discography
 Nursery Rhymes and Good Ol' Times (2002)
 Kiss Your Brain (2003)
 All Day Long (2004)
 Totally Math (2006)
 Is Everybody Happy? (2007)
 Dr. Jean and Friends (2007)
 Just for Fun (2011)

External links

References

American women singers
Georgia State University alumni
Emory University alumni
Education-related YouTube channels
Writers from Tennessee
American YouTubers
Internet memes introduced in 2015
American children's musicians
Schoolteachers from Tennessee
American women educators
1947 births
Living people
People from Milan, Tennessee
Educational and science YouTubers
Music-related YouTube channels
Music YouTubers
21st-century American women